The 1900 Indiana gubernatorial election was held on November 6, 1900 in all 92 counties in the state of Indiana. Governor James Mount could not succeed himself to a second term. Winfield T. Durbin was elected governor over his Democratic opponent, John W. Kern. Mount died from a heart-attack just 2 days after Durbin's inauguration.

Nominations
Durbin (member of the Indiana Republican Central Committee) was nominated to run for governor in 1900, and easily won the convention vote.

Opinion was strongly against Democrats, and the leading members of the party refused to run for governor that year. The party fielded John Kern, a former state senator serving at the time as city solicitor of Indianapolis, to oppose Durbin.

General election
Durbin became the first governor to win by majority in twenty-five years. Durbin's primary goal as governor was to bring efficiency to the state, and reform the government to function more economically, and to enact progressive legislation.

References 

1900 Indiana elections
1900
Indiana